Ramón de Castellazuelo was a Bishop of Zaragoza between 1185 and 1216 AD.

As Bishop, he continued construction on the  Cathedral of Zaragoza which his predecessor Pedro Tarroja had begun.
The project maintained the old mosque, converted into a church, but added it to a head, five apses and a doorway flanked by two square towers.

He accompanied King Pedro III of Aragon in the campaign against Rincón de Ademuz in 1212, participating in the Siege of Al-Dāmūs and Castellfabib.

References

1216 deaths
Archbishops of Zaragoza
13th-century Roman Catholic bishops in the Kingdom of Aragon